The relationship between the Russian Federation and the United Arab Emirates (UAE) stretches back to December 1971, when the Soviet Union and UAE established diplomatic relations. Relations between the two countries have been described as strong and a "strategic partnership", with the countries cooperating closely in Iraq, Egypt and Libya.

Background
The Soviet Union and UAE established diplomatic relations on 8 December 1971. In 1986, the Soviet embassy in Abu Dhabi was opened and the UAE embassy in Moscow was opened in 1987.

Modern relations
Russia has an embassy in Abu Dhabi and UAE has an embassy in Moscow. In 2002, a Russian consulate-general in Dubai was established.

The UAE was alone in the Gulf Cooperation Council in endorsing the 2015 Russian military intervention in the Syrian Civil War, describing it as against a "common enemy" of the two nations.

During 2017, UAE has sought to drive a wedge between Russia and Iran, which the UAE has a poor relationship with. Along with Saudi Arabia and Israel, the UAE encouraged the United States to remove sanctions on Russia pertaining to its activity in Ukraine in exchange for Russian assistance in ending the Iranian military presence in Syria. 

UAE is backing the House of Representatives (Libya) in the Libyan Civil War (2014–present), and Russian mercenary group Wagner Group is working for House of Representatives. 

In 2019, UAE purchased $710 million of anti-tank weapons from Russia.

Even though Russia invaded Ukraine, business between the two countries strengthened and many Russian businessmen has flocked to Dubai to purchase properties and invest in the region. Trade between the two countries has doubled to $5 billion over the last three years and they are approximately 4,000 companies with Russian roots that are operating within the country.

See also
 Foreign relations of Russia
 Foreign relations of the United Arab Emirates
List of ambassadors of Russia to the United Arab Emirates

References

External links

 Documents on the Russia – United Arab Emirates relations at the Russian Ministry of Foreign Affairs

Diplomatic missions
 Embassy of Russia in Abu Dhabi  
 Consulate-General of Russia in Dubai  
 Embassy of the United Arab Emirates in Moscow 

 
United Arab Emirates
Bilateral relations of the United Arab Emirates